Tom Hurd may refer to:
 Tom Hurd (baseball)
 Tom Hurd (civil servant)

See also
Thomas Hurd, officer of the Royal Navy